The PSS silent pistol or MSS "Vul" ("Вул")  is the last completed weapon system resulting from the Soviet development of silent pistols operating on a sealed cartridge system. Two previous designs were considered unacceptable for use due to their limitation to two shots. Earlier systems included the MSP and SP-4M double-barreled pistols. Developed around 1980 for assassinations and reconnaissance, the PSS was first issued to KGB Spetsnaz in 1983. It is under production in the special weapons foundry at TsNIITochMash. PSS pistols are still in use by some FSB and MVD units.

The original PSS was succeeded by the PSS-2 in 2011, using the more powerful silent 7.62×43 mm SP-16 cartridge.

Purpose
The PSS was developed to give Soviet special forces and secret police an almost completely silent option for covert operations such as reconnaissance and assassinations. The weapon uses a special cartridge with an internal piston to achieve this goal. Otherwise, it is a fairly simple double-action pistol. Few details are known about the pistol's performance, as only a few have entered Western hands.

Operation

Cartridge

The PSS uses a specially-developed 7.62×41 mm necked round SP-4 (СП-4), also used by the OTs-38 Stechkin silent revolver. The cartridge contains a propelling charge which drives an internal piston in contact with the base of the bullet. On firing, the piston propels the bullet out of the barrel with enough energy to achieve an effective range of 25 meters. At the end of its travel, the piston seals the cartridge neck, preventing noise, smoke, or blast from escaping.

Combat history
The PSS has been used in the Syrian civil war.

Action
The PSS is recoil-operated. It has a slide designed to operate silently, in keeping with the pistol's design for silent operation. In other respects, the PSS generally follows traditional conventions, except for the slide's guide rod, which is located above the barrel and instead of guide rails on the pistol frame.

Variants
The PSS-2 silenced pistol was developed in Russia, based on the original PSS but with some features of the SR-1M pistol and some improvements. It fires SP-16 noiseless 7.62×43 mm ammunition, more powerful than, but incompatible with, the original 7.62×41 mm cartridge. The PSS-2 was adopted by the Russian FSB security agency in 2011.

Known Users

See also 

 List of Russian weaponry
 NRS-2 Scout Shooting Knife

References

External links
 
 Modern Firearms Page
 video
 www.kalashnikov.ru

Silenced firearms
Semi-automatic pistols of Russia
Semi-automatic pistols of the Soviet Union
7.62 mm firearms
TsNIITochMash products
Weapons and ammunition introduced in 1983